Unepic (stylized as UnEpic) is a video game which was released on September 30, 2011. The game was developed in Barcelona, Spain by Francisco Téllez de Meneses and various collaborators.

Unepic has been translated into over 10 languages, and is available on Steam, Desura, GOG.com, Xbox One, Wii U, PlayStation 4, PlayStation Vita and  Nintendo Switch.

Gameplay

Unepic is a role-playing platformer and Metroidvania game, and includes a number of RPG elements, such as levels, skill points, and equipment. It has non-linear gameplay, and was inspired by the MSX game Maze of Galious. Players can utilize a number of melee and ranged weapons and armors as determined by their level and skill points assigned to an applicable type of equipment. Simple crafting for potions is also available in limited locations, and merchants are present throughout the game, believing the player is a possessed monster. Also included are UNepic Points which are awarded for completion of long and difficult challenges, and allow the purchase of powerful and comical equipment, such as laser guns, flamethrowers, and rocket launchers.

Plot
Daniel was just an average guy. He was a great videogame player, a big fan of sci-fi movies, and a novice RPG player. In the midst of an RPG, he was teleported to a castle. At first, Daniel believed that he was having a massive hallucination. Eager to keep playing within the RPG to create his own adventure, he decides to go along for the ride until his delirium comes to an end.

Once inside the castle, Daniel is inhabited by a mysterious shadow. This dark spirit can communicate with Daniel, but not control him. The shadow has a simple goal: to escape from the prison of Daniel's body. There's a catch, though: The dark spirit can only escape if Daniel perishes.

Struggling against enemies in the castle, with the dark spirit attempting to murder him at every turn. Daniel finally discovers his goal: to kill Harnakon, the master of the castle, and free the Pure-Spirits who are trapped within. While the stage seems set for a typical role-playing adventure, Daniel will soon discover that everything is not what it seems.

Reception

Unepic has received generally mixed reviews, with the PC version receiving a Metacritic score of 68 out of 100 , based on 5 critic reviews. It received a score of 6.5/10 on Destructoid. The game ranked 10th at the Indie of the Year awards of 2011. Unepic was included in the July Jubilee bundle, part of the series of bundles on Indie Royale.

See also 

 Ghost 1.0

References

External links
 
 

2011 video games
Action-adventure games
Indie video games
Linux games
Metroidvania games
MacOS games
Nintendo Switch games
Platform games
PlayStation 4 games
PlayStation Vita games
Steam Greenlight games
Video games with Steam Workshop support
Video games developed in Spain
Video games set in castles
Wii U eShop games
Windows games